Comptes rendus de l'Académie des Sciences (English: Proceedings of the Academy of Sciences), or simply Comptes rendus, is a French scientific journal that has been published since 1835. It is the proceedings of the French Academy of Sciences. It is currently split into seven sections, published on behalf of the Academy by Elsevier: Mathématique, Mécanique, Physique, Géoscience, Palévol, Chimie, and Biologies.

Naming history 
The journal has had a complicated naming history, with several name changes and splits over the years.

1835–1965 
Comptes rendus was initially established in 1835 as Comptes rendus hebdomadaires des séances de l'Académie des Sciences. It began as an alternative publication pathway for more prompt publication than the Mémoires de l'Académie des Sciences, which had been published since 1666. The Mémoires, which continued to be published alongside the Comptes rendus throughout the nineteenth century, had a publication cycle which resulted in memoirs being published years after they had been presented to the Academy. Some academicians continued to prefer publishing in the Mémoires because of the strict page limits in the Comptes rendus.

1966–1980 
After 1965 this title was split into five sections:

 Série A (Sciences mathématiques) – mathematics
 Série B (Sciences physiques) – physics and geosciences
 Série C (Sciences chimiques) – chemistry
 Série D (Sciences naturelles) – life sciences
 Vie académique – academy notices and miscellanea (between 1968 and 1970, and again between 1979 and 1983)

Series A and B were published together in one volume except in 1974.

1981–1993 
The areas were rearranged as follows:

 Série I - (Sciences Mathématiques) - mathematics
 Série II (Mécanique-physique, Chimie, Sciences de l'univers, Sciences de la Terre) - physics, chemistry, astronomy and geosciences
 Série III - (Sciences de la vie) - life sciences
 Vie académique – academy notices and miscellanea (the last 3 volumes of the second edition, between 1981 and 1983)
 Vie des sciences – A renamed Vie académique (from 1984 to 1996)

1994–2001 
These publications remained the same:

 Série I (Sciences mathématiques) – mathematics
 Série III (Sciences de la Vie) – life sciences
 Vie des sciences – A renamed Vie académique (until 1996)

The areas published in Série II were slowly split into other publications in ways that caused some confusion.

In 1994, Série II, which covered physics, chemistry, astronomy and geosciences, was replaced by Série IIA, exclusive to geosciences, and Série IIb, dedicated to chemistry, astronomy and the now-distinct mechanics and physics.

In 1998, Série IIB covered mechanics, physics and astronomy, as chemistry had now its own publication, Série IIC.

In 2000, Série IIB became dedicated exclusively to mechanics, whereas astronomy was redefined as astrophysics and, along with physics, was now being covered by the new Série IV. The latter began publishing in March, however Séries IIB published two more issues, in April and May, still containing material on physics and astrophysics, before starting a new run (under the same title) also in May dedicated solely to mechanics.

2002 onwards 
The present naming and subject assignment was established in 2002:

 Comptes Rendus Biologies – life sciences except paleontology and evolutionary biology. Continues in part Series IIC (biochemistry) and III.
 Comptes Rendus Chimie – chemistry. Continues in part Series IIC.
 Comptes Rendus Géoscience – geosciences. Continues in part Series IIA.
 Comptes Rendus Mathématique – mathematics. Continues Series I.
 Comptes Rendus Mécanique – mechanics. Continues Series IIB.
 Comptes Rendus Palévol – paleontology and evolutionary biology. Continues in part Series IIA and III.
 Comptes Rendus Physique – topical issues in physics (mainly optics, astrophysics and particle physics). Continues Series IV.

Online open archives 

The entirety of Comptes rendus de l'Académie des Sciences publications from its start in 1835 all the way to 1996 have been scanned and undergone character recognition, and are available at the site of the France National Library as part of its free online library and archive of other historical documents and works of art, Gallica.

Besides occasional flaws in the character recognition which might hinder text searches, it's worth pointing out that the files of Comptes rendus de l'Académie des Sciences archives are strewn about the site in a quite disorganized manner. Some volumes are presented as one year's worth of collected material, some as individual issues, and some issues are grouped together for no particular reason. Some parts are broken up by each study instead of issue or volume, some parts are incorrectly tagged, occasionally some issues will be filed as having come before later ones, and so on. Yet it seems that the entire back archives of these publications are indeed present, so researchers unaware of this might miss valuable information. It would be a good idea to see all of a year's releases at the same time—in the "Issue by Date" tab, below the month's calendar, there's a link for that. The links presented here seem to cover the entire available archive of all the scientific publications associated with Comptes rendus de l'Académie des Sciences, and corrections to any flaws found here are welcome.

1835 to 1965:
Comptes rendus hebdomadaires des séances de l'Académie des science: https://gallica.bnf.fr/ark:/12148/cb343481087/date
1966-1980:
Séries A et B, Sciences Mathématiques et Sciences Physiques (1966-1973): https://gallica.bnf.fr/ark:/12148/cb34416987n/date
Série A, Sciences Mathématiques, (1974): https://gallica.bnf.fr/ark:/12148/cb34374637v/date
Série B, Sciences Physiques, (1974): https://gallica.bnf.fr/ark:/12148/cb343746386/date
Séries A et B, Sciences Mathématiques et Sciences Physiques (1975-1980): https://gallica.bnf.fr/ark:/12148/cb34484666t/date
Besides the material for this timeframe, this collection also has a separate set of scans of all the material of Série I - Mathématique from 1981 to 1990.
Série C, Sciences Chimique: https://gallica.bnf.fr/ark:/12148/cb343830642/date
Série D, Sciences Naturelle: https://gallica.bnf.fr/ark:/12148/cb34383065d/date
Vie Académique (1968-1970): https://gallica.bnf.fr/ark:/12148/cb34350517k/date
Vie Académique (1979-1983): http://gallica.bnf.fr/ark:/12148/cb34368082s/date
1981-1983:
Série I - Mathématique: http://gallica.bnf.fr/ark:/12148/cb34368079w/date
The link for Séries A et B, Sciences Mathématiques et Sciences Physiques (1975-1980) has a different set of scans for all of this material.
Série II - Mécanique-physique, Chimie, Sciences de l'univers, Sciences de la Terr: http://gallica.bnf.fr/ark:/12148/cb34383597d/date
The link to Série I - Mathématique (1984-1996) includes a different set of scans for the first 3 issues of 1981 of this series.
Série III - Sciences de la vi: http://gallica.bnf.fr/ark:/12148/cb34368081f/date
1984-1996:
Série I - Mathématique: http://gallica.bnf.fr/ark:/12148/cb34394200t/date
The link for Séries A et B, Sciences Mathématiques et Sciences Physiques (1975-1980) has a different set of scans for this series' material until 1990.
This collection contains a different set of scans of the 1981 material of Série II - Mécanique-physique, Chimie, Sciences de l'univers, Sciences de la Terr (1981-1983).
Série II - Mécanique-physique, Chimie, Sciences de l'univers, Sciences de la Terre (1984-1994): http://gallica.bnf.fr/ark:/12148/cb343942015/date
The first year of material (1994) of material of Série IIb - Mécanique, physique, chimie, astronomie (1995-1996) is misfiled in this collection.
Série IIa - Sciences de la terre et des planètes (1994-1996): http://gallica.bnf.fr/ark:/12148/cb344988776/date
Série IIb - Mécanique, physique, chimie, astronomie (1995-1996): http://gallica.bnf.fr/ark:/12148/cb344988416/date
The first year of material (1994) is misfiled together with Série II - Mécanique-physique, Chimie, Sciences de l'univers, Sciences de la Terre (1994-1996).
Série III - Sciences de la vi: http://gallica.bnf.fr/ark:/12148/cb34394202h/date
Vie des sciences: http://gallica.bnf.fr/ark:/12148/cb343924404/date

All publications from 1997 to 2019 were published commercially by Elsevier. From 2020 on, the Comptes Rendus Palevol have been published by the Muséum National d'Histoire Naturelle (Paris) for the Académie des Sciences. All other series of the Comptes Rendus of the Acamémie des Sciences have been published (from 2020 on) by Mersenne under a Diamond Open Access model.

References

External links 
 
 Comptes Rendus de l'Académie des sciences numérisés sur le site de la Bibliothèque nationale de France
 Scholarly Societies project: French Academy of Sciences page; provides information on naming and publication history up to 1980, as well as on previous journals of the Academy. Retrieved 2006-DEC-10.
 Bibliothèque nationale de France: Catalog record and full-text scans of Comptes rendus. Retrieved 2009-JUN-22.
 Comptes rendus series: 
 ScienceDirect list of titles (from 1997 onwards): https://www.sciencedirect.com/browse/journals-and-books?searchPhrase=comptes

Publications established in 1835
Elsevier academic journals
Multidisciplinary scientific journals
Multilingual journals
French Academy of Sciences
1666 establishments in France
Academic journals associated with learned and professional societies
Academic journal series